Blennidus laurentianus is a species of ground beetle in the subfamily Pterostichinae. It was described by Straneo in 1986.

References

Blennidus
Beetles described in 1986